Earth return or ground return is an electric circuit using the earth for one conductor.  It may refer to:

 Earth-return telegraph
 Single-wire earth return, an electric power distribution system
 Simplex signaling, an earth return signalling system used in telephony